Joseph Kevin McNamara  (5 September 1934 – 6 August 2017) was a British Labour politician who served as a Member of Parliament (MP) for almost 40 years.

Early life
He was educated by the Irish Christian Brothers at St Mary's College, Crosby. He studied for an LLB at the University of Hull. He was head of department in History at St Mary's Grammar School (now called St Mary's College) in Hull from 1958–64 and a Law lecturer at Hull College of Commerce from 1964–66.

Parliamentary career
After unsuccessfully contesting Bridlington in 1964, McNamara was elected to the House of Commons as Member of Parliament (MP) for Kingston upon Hull North, in a by-election in January 1966 following the death of sitting Labour MP Henry Solomons. Labour's hold of a former marginal seat with a significantly increased majority is widely considered to have helped to convince the prime minister Harold Wilson to call the 1966 election to seek a larger majority.

McNamara retained his seat at the 1966 general election, and at subsequent elections until the constituency was abolished for the February 1974 general election, when he transferred to the new Kingston upon Hull Central constituency. When that constituency was abolished for the 1983 election, McNamara was re-elected for the re-created Kingston upon Hull North constituency.

McNamara campaigned in his last years in parliament on many issues, protesting against the Act of Succession which prohibits a Roman Catholic or the spouse of a Roman Catholic to be the British monarch. He stepped down at the 2005 general election, with the local Constituency Labour Party choosing Diana Johnson to stand in his place.

During the 2005 general election campaign McNamara claimed some of the policies regarding illegal travellers' sites of the leader of the Conservative Party, Michael Howard had "whiff of the gas chambers" about them. Howard's grandmother was murdered at Auschwitz.

Northern Ireland
McNamara was known throughout his parliamentary career as a supporter of Irish nationalism who favoured a United Ireland. After entering parliament, he soon became interested in reports of discrimination against the Catholic minority in Northern Ireland and supported the Campaign for Democracy in Ulster (CDU). He served as a frontbench spokesman for the Labour Party, including Shadow Secretary of State for Northern Ireland under Neil Kinnock, 1987–94, an appointment that was widely criticised by Unionists.

After Tony Blair became Labour leader, he replaced McNamara as Northern Ireland spokesman with Mo Mowlam. In 1997, he helped persuade the newly elected Labour government to donate £5,000 (thereby matching the contribution of the Irish government) for the erection of a memorial in Liverpool to the victims of the Great Irish Famine.

McNamara also supported Republicanism in the United Kingdom and joined the All-Party Parliamentary Republic Group.

Personal and later life
McNamara was a Roman Catholic and a Knight of the Pontifical Order of Saint Gregory the Great. He was married to Nora McNamara, and was the father of four sons and a daughter.

In 2006, McNamara received the honorary degree of Doctor of Laws from the University of Hull in recognition of his long service in politics. He graduated with a PhD from the University of Liverpool in 2007 having completed a thesis on the MacBride Principles at the Institute of Irish Studies, where he gave the 2008 John Kennedy Lecture in Irish Studies, .

Illness and death
In 2017, McNamara was diagnosed with pancreatic cancer while on holiday in Spain. On 6 August, it was reported that he had died, aged 82.

References

External links
 
 Retirement
 Association of Papal Orders in Great Britain
 The Times, 22 March 2005
 Institute of Irish Studies, University of Liverpool
 BBC Vote 2001, candidate biographies
 Conflict Archive on the Internet (CAIN), Biographies of Prominent People
 University of Hull, News Archive

1934 births
2017 deaths
Labour Party (UK) MPs for English constituencies
Transport and General Workers' Union-sponsored MPs
UK MPs 1964–1966
UK MPs 1966–1970
UK MPs 1970–1974
UK MPs 1974
UK MPs 1974–1979
UK MPs 1979–1983
UK MPs 1983–1987
UK MPs 1987–1992
UK MPs 1992–1997
UK MPs 1997–2001
UK MPs 2001–2005
English people of Irish descent
People educated at St Mary's College, Crosby
British Roman Catholics
British republicans
Knights of St. Gregory the Great
People from Crosby, Merseyside
Place of birth missing